Walter Clifford Minnick (born September 20, 1942) is an American politician who served as a U.S. Representative for , serving from 2009 until 2011. He is a member of the Democratic Party.

The district is in the western part of the state, and includes roughly one-fourth of Boise and most of its suburbs, as well as Meridian and Nampa. It also includes the cities of Lewiston, Moscow and Coeur d'Alene.

In 2008, Minnick defeated incumbent Bill Sali to win his office, but in 2010 he was defeated by challenger Raúl Labrador in the general election. After leaving office, he co-founded the lobbying firm The Majority Group with his former chief-of-staff Rob Ellsworth and Wall Street attorney Chris DiAngelo.

Early life, education and career
Minnick was born in Walla Walla, Washington, and grew up on a wheat farm. In 1964 he received his bachelor's degree from Whitman College, where he was on the debate team, and was then accepted by Harvard Business School. After graduating with an MBA in 1966, he entered Harvard Law School, and graduated with a JD in 1969.

A veteran who served in the Army and Pentagon during the Vietnam War, he is the former leader of a forestry industry and founder of a chain of retail nurseries, SummerWinds Garden Centers. Minnick also served as CEO of TJ International (acquired by Weyerhaeuser in 1999) and has served on the board of directors of several corporations and nonprofit organizations.

Early political career
Minnick served as a staff assistant to President Richard Nixon on the White House Domestic Council from 1971 to 1972 and as a deputy assistant director for the Office of Management and Budget from 1972 to 1973. He was also involved in the creation of the Drug Enforcement Administration. Minnick resigned from the administration in October 1973 in protest of the Watergate-era "Saturday Night massacre" in which Nixon dismissed United States Attorney General Elliot Richardson, special prosecutor Archibald Cox, and others. Minnick is a businessman and politician who resides in Boise.

Minnick, who long considered himself a political independent, was recruited to run against incumbent Republican Senator Larry Craig in the 1996 Senate election in Idaho by then-Senator Bob Kerrey of Nebraska. Although Minnick originally intended to enter the race as an Independent, he was convinced to run as a Democrat by former Idaho Governor Cecil D. Andrus. Minnick lost the race 283,532 votes (57.02%) to 198,422 (39.91%).

U.S. House of Representatives

Elections
2008

Minnick ran unopposed in the 2008 Democratic primary held in late May. An expected primary challenge by 2006 nominee Larry Grant was averted when Grant withdrew from the race and endorsed Minnick the month prior. Although the 1st is a heavily Republican district, Democrats thought they had a realistic chance of winning the district because the Republican incumbent, Bill Sali, had been a lightning rod for controversy.

In the November 4, 2008 general election, Minnick narrowly defeated Sali, taking 50.6 percent of the vote to Sali's 49.4 percent. While Minnick carried only seven of the district's 18 counties, he prevailed largely by winning the district's share of Ada County, home to Boise and more than two-thirds of the district's vote, by 4,000 votes. With his victory, Minnick represented the third most Republican district in the nation to be held by a Democrat and he became the first Democrat to represent Idaho at the federal level since Larry LaRocco, who represented the 1st District for two terms until the 1994 elections. At the time, the district had a Cook Partisan Voting Index of R+18. John McCain easily carried the district with over 60 percent of the vote in 2008.

2010

Minnick was the only Democrat endorsed by the Tea Party Express, a conservative group. Minnick was challenged by Republican state Representative Raúl Labrador, Libertarian Mike Washburn, and Independent Dave Olson. Despite polls showing Minnick leading, Labrador defeated him by a 51–41 margin in an upset. Since Minnick left office, no other Democrat has represented Idaho in Congress.

Tenure
After taking office, Minnick joined the Blue Dog Coalition of House Democrats. He voted with his party 71% of the time.

In January 2009, Minnick joined with 10 other Democrats to oppose the American Recovery and Reinvestment Act of 2009. In June 2009, Congressman Minnick voted with 43 other Democrats against the American Clean Energy and Security Act, and in December 2009, voted with 38 other Democrats against the Affordable Health Care for America Act. Minnick was the lone Democrat to receive a perfect score from the Club for Growth on their RePork Card ratings, for his votes to cut spending in Congress.

Minnick voted against the Stupak–Pitts Amendment which proposed to put restrictions on federal funds "to pay for any abortion or to cover any part of the costs of any health plan that includes coverage of abortion" except in cases of rape, incest or danger to the life of the mother. On March 21, 2010, Minnick voted against the Patient Protection and Affordable Care Act that President Barack Obama signed into law on March 23, 2010. Minnick said that there is very little cost control in the bill.

Minnick voted for the Lilly Ledbetter Fair Pay Act of 2009, the Helping Families Save Their Homes Act of 2009, the Family Smoking Prevention and Tobacco Control Act, the Local Law Enforcement Hate Crimes Prevention Act, and against establishing spending caps through fiscal year 2014.

Committee assignments
Committee on Agriculture
Subcommittee on Conservation, Credit, Energy, and Research
Subcommittee on Livestock, Dairy, and Poultry
Subcommittee on Specialty Crops, Rural Development and Foreign Agriculture
Committee on Financial Services
Subcommittee on Capital Markets, Insurance, and Government-Sponsored Enterprises
Subcommittee on Financial Institutions and Consumer Credit

Electoral history

References

External links
Walt Minnick for U.S. Congress official campaign site
 

1942 births
American Unitarian Universalists
Harvard University alumni
Living people
Nixon administration personnel
Politicians from Walla Walla, Washington
Whitman College alumni
Democratic Party members of the United States House of Representatives from Idaho
21st-century American politicians
Members of Congress who became lobbyists